The Mariana kingfisher (Todiramphus albicilla) is a species of bird in the family Alcedinidae. It is endemic to the Northern Mariana Islands. Its natural habitats are subtropical or tropical moist lowland forests and plantations.  It was formerly considered a subspecies of the collared kingfisher.

Subspecies

 T. a. owstoni (Rothschild, 1904) – northern Mariana Islands 
 T. a. albicilla (Dumont, 1823) – southern Mariana Islands   
 T. a. orii (Taka-Tsukasa & Momiyama, 1931) – Rota

References

External links

Mariana kingfisher
Birds of the Northern Mariana Islands
Mariana kingfisher
Mariana kingfisher